Héctor Raúl Cúper (born 16 November 1955) is an Argentine football manager and former player who is currently head coach of the Syria national team.

As a player, he was a defender who spent most of his career at Club Ferro Carril Oeste, where played 463 games. His nickname was "Cabezón" ("Big head").

He made his managerial breakthrough at Mallorca, reaching the Copa del Rey final in 1998 and the final of the UEFA Cup Winners' Cup a year later, as well as a best-ever third-place finish. In two years at Valencia, he reached the UEFA Champions League final twice, earning a move to Italy's Internazionale in 2001.

Cúper also managed Betis and Racing Santander in La Liga, and Parma in Serie A. He later coached the national teams of Georgia, Egypt, Uzbekistan and DR Congo, taking the second of those countries to the 2017 Africa Cup of Nations final and a place at the 2018 FIFA World Cup.

Personal life
Cúper's great-grandfather was an Englishman whose surname was Cooper, who migrated to Santa Fe Province in Argentina and married an indigenous woman. However, the majority of his heritage is Italian.

He was born in Chábas, a small settlement in Santa Fe. His mother died at the age of 20, months after the birth of his younger brother, and he was raised by his grandmother.

Playing career
As with most aspiring footballers in Chábas in the 1960s, Cúper moved to Buenos Aires to pursue his career. He took leave from his job at a bank to search for a team in the capital city, eventually being signed by Ferro Carril Oeste. While at the club, he won the Argentine Primera División in 1982 and 1984.

Managerial career

Early career
Cúper started his coaching career with Huracán, a year and a half after his retirement. He led the club to the 2nd place in the Clausura 1994 tournament, eventually losing the last match against the rivals for the title Independiente. In 1995 he moved to Lanús, where he won his first trophy as manager, the Copa CONMEBOL. 

In the summer of 1997, he was hired by Mallorca, and in the very first season he drove the modest club to the final of the Copa del Rey, which he would lose against Barcelona, but won the 1998 Supercopa de España against the same opponent. The following season the team reached the final of the UEFA Cup Winners' Cup, where they lost to Lazio at Villa Park.  That season Mallorca also recorded their best-ever La Liga finish of 3rd, allowing the team to play in the UEFA Champions League.

Valencia
In March 1999, Valencia manager Claudio Ranieri stated that he wanted Cúper to be his successor when he left at the end of the season; Cúper turned down a new contract at Mallorca and left in June. At Valencia, he won another Supercopa de España but lost the final of the Champions League two consecutive times; in 2000 against Real Madrid, and in 2001 against Bayern Munich on penalty shoot-out.

Internazionale
On 22 June 2001, Cúper was hired by Italian club Internazionale, replacing Marco Tardelli. In his first season, the club started the final day on 5 May 2002 in pole position for a first Scudetto since 1989, but lost to Lazio and handed the title to rivals Juventus, retreating to the 3rd place.

In the 2002–03 season, Cúper's team ended up at 2nd place in Serie A and lost in the semi-finals of UEFA Champions League to city rivals AC Milan on the away goals rule, despite both teams playing their home games at the San Siro. He was fired from the club on 19 October 2003, after six matches of the 2003–04 season, when the team was in 8th place.

Mallorca return, Betis, Parma

On 2 November 2004 Cúper returned to Mallorca after the sacking of Benito Floro, with the team 19th after 10 matches. He saved the team from relegation on the last day, and made several signings, but resigned on 14 February 2006 with the team last following a nine-game winless run.

On 16 July 2007, Cúper was revealed as the new manager of Real Betis on a one-year deal. He was sacked on 2 December with the team 19th after losing at home to Atlético Madrid.

On 11 March 2008 he was unveiled as the new boss of relegation-battling Serie A team Parma, replacing Domenico Di Carlo at the helm of the Gialloblù. He was then sacked two months later before the final game of the season after winning only two in 10 matches as manager, this eventually leading to Parma's relegation to Serie B.

2008–2013
In August 2008, Cúper became the head coach of the Georgia national team. He agreed to step down in November 2009 before the expiration of his contract, having taken just three points and no wins in 2010 FIFA World Cup qualification.

On 3 November 2009, Cúper agreed to continue his managerial career with Greek club Aris Thessaloniki until the end of the 2009–10 season. On 15 December, he extended his contract with Aris until June 2011. On 24 April Cúper lost another final, this time in the Greek Football Cup against Panathinaikos.

In the 2010–11 season, Cúper lead Aris in its first participation in the Round of 32 of the 2010–11 UEFA Europa League, taking the club to second place in Group B with 10 points, after two surprise wins against Atlético Madrid. On 18 January 2011 after some bad results in Greece, Cúper decided to step down from his managerial position.

On 29 June 2011, Cúper returned to La Liga with Racing Santander, signing for one season. However, after five months he left the last-placed team by mutual agreement with the board.

Cúper signed a contract with Süper Lig side Orduspor on 19 December 2011, but left by mutual consent on 13 April 2013.

On 14 November 2013, Cúper was announced as new head coach of the UAE League side Al Wasl. He was sacked on 4 March 2014 due to poor results.

Return to international football

Egypt

On 2 March 2015, the Egyptian Football Association appointed Cúper as the new manager of their national football team. At the 2017 Africa Cup of Nations, he led the team to the final, which they lost 2–1 to Cameroon.

He led Egypt to the 2018 FIFA World Cup, their first appearance in the tournament since 1990, after defeating Congo by 2–1. His contract was due to expire at the end of the tournament, and negotiations were postponed until its conclusion. Following defeats in Egypt's three group games at the tournament, it was announced that Cúper's contract would not be renewed.

Uzbekistan
On 1 August 2018, Cúper became head coach of the Uzbekistan national team, signing a contract that would take him through to the 2022 FIFA World Cup. He was sacked in September 2019 after a shock 2–0 loss away to Palestine in the first qualifying game for that tournament.

DR Congo
On 13 May 2021, Cúper was appointed manager of the DR Congo. He lost 1–0 away to Tunisia in a friendly on his debut on 5 June. In March, his team missed out on the 2022 FIFA World Cup after a 5–2 aggregate playoff loss to Morocco. He was dismissed on 9 June 2022, having lost to Gabon and Sudan in the first 2023 Africa Cup of Nations qualifiers.

Syria
On 2 February 2023, he became the head coach of Syria national team.

Managerial statistics

Honours

Manager
Huracán
Clausura runner-up: 1994

Lanús
Copa CONMEBOL: 1996

Mallorca
Supercopa de España: 1998
Copa del Rey runner-up: 1997–98
UEFA Cup Winners' Cup runner-up: 1998–99

Valencia
Supercopa de España: 1999
UEFA Champions League runner-up: 1999–2000, 2000–01

Aris FC Thessaloniki 
 Greek Cup runner-up: 2009–10

Egypt
 Africa Cup of Nations runner-up: 2017

Individual
La Liga Coach of the Year – Don Balón Award: 1999
UEFA Club Coach of the Year: 2000
European Coach of the Year—Tommaso Maestrelli Award: 2000
Globe Soccer Awards best Best Arab National Team Coach: 2017
CAF Coach of the Year: 2017

References

External links

1955 births
Living people
People from Caseros Department
Sportspeople from Santa Fe Province
Argentine people of English descent
Argentine people of Italian descent
Argentine people of indigenous peoples descent
Argentine footballers
Association football central defenders
Ferro Carril Oeste footballers
Independiente Rivadavia footballers
Club Atlético Huracán footballers
Argentine Primera División players
Primera Nacional players
Argentina international footballers
Argentine football managers
Club Atlético Huracán managers
Club Atlético Lanús managers
RCD Mallorca managers
Valencia CF managers
Inter Milan managers
Real Betis managers
Parma Calcio 1913 managers
Georgia national football team managers
Aris Thessaloniki F.C. managers
Racing de Santander managers
Orduspor managers
Al-Wasl F.C. managers
Egypt national football team managers
Uzbekistan national football team managers
Democratic Republic of the Congo national football team managers
Syria national football team managers
Argentine Primera División managers
La Liga managers
Serie A managers
Super League Greece managers
Süper Lig managers
UAE Pro League managers
2017 Africa Cup of Nations managers
2018 FIFA World Cup managers
2019 AFC Asian Cup managers
Argentine expatriate football managers
Argentine expatriate sportspeople in Spain
Argentine expatriate sportspeople in Italy
Argentine expatriate sportspeople in Greece
Argentine expatriate sportspeople in Georgia (country)
Argentine expatriate sportspeople in Turkey
Argentine expatriate sportspeople in the United Arab Emirates
Argentine expatriate sportspeople in Egypt
Argentine expatriate sportspeople in Uzbekistan
Argentine expatriate sportspeople in the Democratic Republic of the Congo
Argentine expatriate sportspeople in Syria
Expatriate football managers in Spain
Expatriate football managers in Italy
Expatriate football managers in Greece
Expatriate football managers in Georgia (country)
Expatriate football managers in Turkey
Expatriate football managers in the United Arab Emirates
Expatriate football managers in Egypt
Expatriate football managers in Uzbekistan
Expatriate football managers in the Democratic Republic of the Congo
Expatriate football managers in Syria